is a 2007 Japanese drama film directed by  Takashi Yamazaki, based on the manga Sunset on Third Street by Ryōhei Saigan. It is a sequel to  Always: Sunset on Third Street (2005). 
At the 31st Japan Academy Film Prize it won two awards and received eleven other nominations. The film was Godzilla's first full CGI cameo outside of his own film series.

Cast 
 Hidetaka Yoshioka
 Shinichi Tsutsumi
 Koyuki
 Maki Horikita
 Hiroko Yakushimaru
 Ayame Koike

Awards and nominations 
31st Japan Academy Prize. 
Won: Best Actor - Hidetaka Yoshioka
Won: Best Sound Recording - Hitoshi Tsurumaki
Nominated: Best Picture
Nominated: Best Director - Takashi Yamazaki
Nominated: Best Screenplay - Takashi Yamazaki and Ryota Kosawa
Nominated: Best Actor in a Supporting Role - Shinichi Tsutsumi
Nominated: Best Actress in a Supporting Role - Maki Horikita
Nominated: Best Actress in a Supporting Role - Hiroko Yakushimaru
Nominated: Best Music - Naoki Sato
Nominated: Best Cinematography - Kozo Shibasaki
Nominated: Best Lighting Direction - Kenichi Mizuno
Nominated: Best Art Direction - Anri Jojo
Nominated: Best Film Editing - Ryuji Miyajima
Asian Film Awards 2008

 Nominated: Best Supporting Actor – Shinichi Tsutsumi
 Nominated: Best Supporting Actress – Hiroko Yakushimaru
 Nominated: Best Visual Effects – Takashi Yamazaki

References

External links 
  
 

Films set in Tokyo
2007 films
2007 drama films
2000s monster movies
Live-action films based on manga
Films directed by Takashi Yamazaki
Japanese drama films
2000s Japanese-language films
Sunset on Third Street
Films scored by Naoki Satō
2000s Japanese films